This is a list of notable events in music that took place in the year 1955.

Specific locations
1955 in British music
1955 in Norwegian music

Specific genres
1955 in country music
1955 in jazz

Events
January 1 – RCA Victor announces a marketing plan called "Operation TNT." The label drops the list price on LPs from $5.95 to $3.98, EPs from $4.95 to $2.98, 45 EPs from $1.58 to $1.49 and 45's from $1.16 to $.89. Other record labels follow RCA's lead and begin to drop prices as well.
January 7
 Marian Anderson is the first African American singer to perform at the Metropolitan Opera in New York City.
 "Rock Around the Clock" by Bill Haley & His Comets first appears on the British charts.
January 14 – In New York City, Alan Freed produces the first rock and roll concert.
January 27 – Michael Tippett's opera The Midsummer Marriage is premiered at the Royal Opera House, Covent Garden in London, conducted by John Pritchard, with designs by Barbara Hepworth and choreography by John Cranko; it arouses controversy.
February 19 – Dot Records introduces a new singer, Pat Boone, with an advertisement in Billboard magazine calling him "a great new voice". His first record for Dot Records is "Two Hearts, Two Kisses, One Love."
February 24 – Carlisle Floyd's opera Susannah is premiered in the Ruby Diamond Auditorium of Florida State University, Tallahassee with Phyllis Curtin in the title role.
February 26 – For the first time since their introduction in 1949, 45 rpm discs begin to outsell standard 78s.
February – Kay Starr leaves Capitol to sign with RCA.
March 3 – Italian soprano Mirella Freni makes her operatic debut as Micaëla in Carmen at the Teatro Municipale in her native Modena.
March 7 – The Broadway production of Peter Pan, starring Mary Martin, is presented on American television for the first time by NBC-TV with its original cast, as an installment of Producers' Showcase. It is also the first time that a stage musical is presented in its entirety on TV almost exactly as it was performed on stage. This program gains the largest viewership of a TV special up to this time and becomes one of the first great TV family musical classics.
March 15 – Colonel Tom Parker becomes Elvis Presley's de facto manager.
March 19 – The film Blackboard Jungle is premièred in New York City, featuring Bill Haley & His Comets' "Rock Around the Clock" over the opening credits, the first use of a rock and roll song in a major film.
March 22 – Decca Records signs DJ Alan Freed as an A&R man.
March 26 – Bill Hayes tops the US charts for five weeks with "The Ballad of Davy Crockett" and starts a (fake) coonskin cap craze.
April 14 – Imperial Records in the United States release "Ain't That a Shame" by Fats Domino (co-written with Dave Bartholomew). It reaches #1 in the R&B chart and becomes over time a million seller, bringing Domino to prominence and giving his work covers by white artists: Pat Boone makes this song a Billboard number-one single of 1955 for jukebox play.
May 13 – First riot at an Elvis Presley concert takes place in Jacksonville, Florida.
May 21 – Chuck Berry records his first single, "Maybellene", for Chess Records in Chicago.
May 22 – Bridgeport, Connecticut, authorities cancel a rock concert to be headlined by Fats Domino for fear of a riot breaking out.
June
The 29th International Society for Contemporary Music Festival takes place in Baden-Baden.
The newly formed Netherlands Chamber Orchestra gives its first performance at the Holland Festival.
June 2 – Italian singers Natalino Otto and Flo Sandon's marry.
June 16 – Glenn Gould completes his recording of Bach's Goldberg Variations.
June 18
 Pearl Carr & Teddy Johnson marry in the U.K.
 Pierre Boulez's influential composition Le marteau sans maître ("The hammer without a master"), for contralto and six instrumentalists, is premiered (in its first revised version) at the International Society for Contemporary Music Festival in Baden-Baden at the insistence of Heinrich Strobel.
July 9 – "Rock Around the Clock" becomes the first Rock and roll single to reach Number One on the American charts.
July 13 – The Beaux Arts Trio make their debut at the Berkshire Music Festival.
August 8 – Luigi Nono marries Arnold Schoenberg's daughter Nuria in Venice.
August 19 – WINS radio station in New York City adopts a policy of not playing white cover versions of black R&B songs.
August 31 – A Londoner is fined for "creating an abominable noise" for playing "Shake, Rattle, and Roll" at top volume.
September 3 – Little Richard records "Tutti Frutti" in New Orleans with significantly cleaned up lyrics (originally "Tutti Frutti, good booty" among other things); it is released in October.
September 26 – "America's Sweethearts", singers Eddie Fisher and Debbie Reynolds, marry.
October 15 – Elvis Presley plays a concert in Lubbock, Texas. Opening act is local duo Buddy and Bob, Buddy being future rock star Buddy Holly.
October 20 – Disc jockey Bill Randle of WERE (Cleveland) is the key presenter of a concert at Brooklyn High School (Ohio), featuring Pat Boone and Bill Haley & His Comets and opening with Elvis Presley, not only Elvis's first performance north of the Mason–Dixon line, but also his first filmed performance, for a documentary on Randle titled The Pied Piper of Cleveland.
October 29 – Dmitri Shostakovich's Violin Concerto No. 1, originally completed in 1948, is premiered by the Leningrad Philharmonic Orchestra with its dedicatee, David Oistrakh, as soloist.
November 4 – William Schuman's orchestral piece Credendum: Article of Faith, commissioned by UNESCO, is premiered in Cincinnati.
November 12 – Billboard magazine DJ poll names Elvis Presley as the most promising new country and western singer.
November 20 – Bo Diddley makes his debut TV appearance on The Ed Sullivan Show on CBS television.
November 22 – Colonel Tom Parker signs Elvis Presley to RCA Records.
November 29 – Juan José Castro conducts the UK première of Carlos Chávez's Symphony No. 3 at the Maida Vale Studios with the London Symphony Orchestra.
December 15 – Sun Records releases "Folsom Prison Blues" recorded by Johnny Cash on July 30.
Christmas – The Temperance Seven is founded as a jazz band, initially comprising three members from the Chelsea School of Art in London.
Paul Simon and Art Garfunkel write their first song, "The Girl For Me" (copyrighted with the Library of Congress in 1956), and begin singing together as a duo while still in high school in New York City.
Nine-year-old Al Green forms a gospel quartet, the Green Brothers.
Clyde McPhatter launches a solo career.
Renato Carosone and Nicola Salerno meet and start their songwriting partnership.
Astor Piazzolla, returning to Argentina from his studies with Nadia Boulanger, forms his string orchestra (Orquesta de Cuerdas) and octet (Octeto Buenos Aires) and introduces the nuevo tango style.
Indian santoor player Shivkumar Sharma gives his first public performance in Bombay.
Etta James makes her debut with "The Wallflower (Dance with Me, Henry)" which tops the R&B Chart but is considered too risqué for pop radio. The song is subsequently covered by Georgia Gibbs in a sanitized version where the line "Roll with me Henry" is changed to "Dance with me Henry"
Publication of Neue Mozart-Ausgabe begins.

Albums released

In 1955, 1,615 albums and 4,542 pop singles were released in the US.

And I Thought About You – Patti Page
 At the Cafe Bohemia, Vol. 1 – The Jazz Messengers
 At the Cafe Bohemia, Vol. 2 – The Jazz Messengers
 Day Dreams – Doris Day
 Blue Moods – Miles Davis
 Brute Force Steel Bands of Antigua, B.W.I.
 Christmas with Patti Page – Patti Page
 Clifford Brown with Strings – Clifford Brown
 Cloud 7 – Tony Bennett
 Concert by the Sea – Erroll Garner
 Dinner in Caracas – Aldemaro Romero
 Doris Day in Hollywood – Doris Day
 Eddie Fisher Sings Academy Award Winning Songs – Eddie Fisher
 Especially for You... – Teresa Brewer
 Four Brothers – Ames Brothers
 Happy Holiday – Jo Stafford
 The Hi-Lo's, I Presume – The Hi-Lo's
 I Cry for You – Johnnie Ray
 I Love You – Eddie Fisher
 In a Blue Mood – Kay Starr
 In a Romantic Mood – Oscar Peterson
 In the Land of Hi-Fi – Sarah Vaughan
 In the Wee Small Hours – Frank Sinatra
 Jazz Spectacular – Frankie Laine & Buck Clayton
 Julie Is Her Name – Julie London
 Love Me or Leave Me – Doris Day
 Lovers' Laine – Frankie Laine
 Meet Betty Carter and Ray Bryant – Betty Carter and Ray Bryant
 Memory Songs – Jo Stafford
 Moments to Remember – The Four Lads
 Music Ala Carte – The Crew-Cuts
 The Musings of Miles – Miles Davis
 Noël Coward at Las Vegas – Noël Coward
 Oklahoma! – Original Broadway Cast
 Oscar Peterson Plays Count Basie – Oscar Peterson
 The One, the Only Kay Starr – Kay Starr
 Quintet/Sextet – Miles Davis
 Rain or Shine – Dick Haymes
 Rock Around the Clock – Bill Haley & His Comets
 Romance on the Range – Patti Page
 Satch Plays Fats – Louis Armstrong
 Shake, Rattle and Roll – Bill Haley & His Comets
 So Smooth – Perry Como
 Soft and Sentimental – Jo Stafford
 Songs of Scotland – Jo Stafford
 Songs from Pete Kelly's Blues – Peggy Lee, Ella Fitzgerald
 Starring Sammy Davis Jr. – Sammy Davis Jr.
 Study in Brown – Clifford Brown and Max Roach
 Swingin' Down Yonder – Dean Martin
 Symphony No. 10 (Shostakovich) – Philharmonic-Symphony Orchestra of New York, Dimitri Mitropoulos, conductor (12-inch LP. Columbia Masterworks ML 4959)
 Thelonious Monk Plays Duke Ellington – Thelonious Monk
 Voice of our Choice – Guy Mitchell
The Waltz Queen – Patti Page

Biggest hit singles
The following singles achieved the highest chart positions
in the set of charts available for 1955.

US No. 1 hit singles
These singles reached the top of US Billboard magazine's charts in 1955.

Top hits on record

Top R&B and country hits on record
"Ain't That a Shame" – Fats Domino
"Close Your Eyes" – The Five Keys
"Earth Angel" – The Penguins
"Flip, Flop and Fly" – Big Joe Turner
"Lonely Nights" – The Hearts
"Love Love Love" – Webb Pierce
"Silver Threads and Golden Needles" – Wanda Jackson
"Tutti Frutti" – Little Richard
"Tweedle Dee" – LaVern Baker
"The Wallflower" – Etta James
"At My Front Door" – The El Dorados

Published popular music

 "Adelaide" – w.m. Frank Loesser
 "Ain't That a Shame" – w.m. Fats Domino and Dave Bartholomew
 "Ain't That Lovin' You Baby" – w.m. Jimmy Reed
 "All At Once You Love Her" – w. Oscar Hammerstein II m. Richard Rodgers
 "Arrivederci Roma" – w. (Eng) Carl Sigman m. Renato Ranucci
 "Ballad Of Davy Crockett" – w. Tom Blackburn m. George Bruns
 "Band of Gold" – w. Bob Musel m. Jack Taylor
 "The Bible Tells Me So" – w.m. Dale Evans
 "Black Denim Trousers And Motorcycle Boots" – w.m. Jerry Leiber and Mike Stoller
 "Blue Monday" – w.m. Fats Domino and Dave Bartholomew
 "Blue Star" w. Edward Heyman m. Victor Young
 "Blue Suede Shoes" – w.m. Carl Perkins
 "Bo Diddley" – w.m. Ellas McDaniel
 "Charlie Brown" – w.m. Jerry Leiber and Mike Stoller
 "Christmas Alphabet" – Buddy Kaye, Jules Loman
 "Dance with Me, Henry" – w.m. Johnny Otis, Hank Ballard and Etta James aka "Wallflower"
 "Day-O (The Banana Boat Song)" – trad West Indies arr. William Attaway and Irving Burgie (aka Lord Burgess)
 "Domani" – w. Tony Velona m. Ulpio Minucci
 "Don't Be Angry" – w.m. Nappy Brown, Rose Marie McCoy and Fred Mendelsohn
 "Dreamboat" – w.m. Jack Hoffman
 "Dungaree Doll" – w. Ben Raleigh m. Sherman Edwards
 "En Tu Reja" – m. Aldemaro Romero, arranged for accordion quartet by John Serry Sr.
 "Folsom Prison Blues" – w.m. Johnny Cash
 "Forever Darling" w. Sammy Cahn m. Bronislau Kaper. Introduced by Desi Arnaz in the 1956 film Forever, Darling
 "The Great Pretender" – w.m. Buck Ram
 "Hallelujah I Love Her So" – w.m. Ray Charles
 "He" – w. Richard Mullan m. Jack Richards
 "He's a Tramp" w.m. Peggy Lee and Sonny Burke. Introduced by Peggy Lee in the animated film Lady and the Tramp
 "Heart" – w.m. Richard Adler and Jerry Ross
 "Hey, Mister Banjo" – w.m. Freddy Morgan and Norman Malkin
 "I Hear You Knocking" – w.m. Dave Bartholomew and Pearl King
 "Holiday in Rio" – m. Terig Tucci arranged for accordion quartet by John Serry Sr.
 "I Never Has Seen Snow" – w. Truman Capote and Harold Arlen m. Harold Arlen
 "I'll Never Stop Loving You" w. Sammy Cahn m. Nicholas Brodszky. Introduced by Doris Day in the film Love Me or Leave Me.
 "I'm in Love Again" – w.m. Fats Dominio and Dave Bartholomew
 "In the Wee Small Hours of the Morning" w. Bob Hilliard m. Dave Mann
 "Innamorata" – w. Jack Brooks m. Harry Warren Introduced by Dean Martin in the film Artists and Models
 "It's Almost Tomorrow" – w. Wade Buff m. Gene Adkinson
 "Jamaica Farewell" – w.m. Lord Burgess
 "Jim Dandy" – w.m. Lincoln Chase
 "Ko Ko Mo (I Love You So)" – w.m. Forest Wilson, Jake Porter and Eunice Levy
 "Learnin' The Blues" – w.m. Dolores Vicki Silvers
 "Life Could Not Better Be" – w.m. Sylvia Fine and Sammy Cahn. Introduced by Danny Kaye in the film The Court Jester.
 "Little One (1956 song)" – w.m. Cole Porter
 "Love and Marriage" – w. Sammy Cahn m. Jimmy Van Heusen
 "Love Is a Many-Splendored Thing" – w. Paul Francis Webster m. Sammy Fain
 "Monolas" – m. Manolo Escobar, arranged for accordion quartet by John Serry Sr.
 "Maybellene" – w.m. Chuck Berry, Russ Frato and Alan Freed
 "Memories Are Made of This" – w.m. Terry Gilkyson, Rich Dehr and Frank Miller
 "Mind if I Make Love to You?" – w.m. Cole Porter
 "Moments To Remember" – w. Al Stillman m. Robert Allen
 "Mr. Wonderful" – w.m. Jerry Bock, George David Weiss and Larry Holofcener
 "My Boy – Flat Top" – w.m. Boyd Bennett and John Young Jr
 "No, Not Much" – w. Al Stillman m. Robert Allen
 "Once-a-Year Day" – w.m. Richard Adler and Jerry Ross from the musical The Pajama Game
 "An Occasional Man" w.m. Ralph Blane and Hugh Martin. Introduced by Gloria DeHaven in the film The Girl Rush
 "Paper Roses" – w. Janice Torre m. Fred Spielman
 "Pet Me Poppa" – w.m. Frank Loesser
 "Pete Kelly's Blues" – w. Sammy Cahn m. Ray Heindorf
 "Relax-Ay-Voo" – Sammy Cahn and Arthur Schwartz
 "Robin Hood" w.m. Carl Sigman. Theme song of the Television series starring Richard Greene.
 "The Rock and Roll Waltz" – w. Dick Ware m. Shorty Allen
 "Rock-A-Beatin' Boogie" – w.m. Bill Haley
 "Same Old Saturday Night" – w. Sammy Cahn m. Frank Reardon
 "See You Later Alligator" – w.m. Robert Guidry
 "Seven-and-a-Half Cents" – w.m. Richard Adler and Jerry Ross
 "The Siamese Cat Song" – w.m. Peggy Lee and Sonny Burke. Introduced by Peggy Lee in the animated film Lady and the Tramp.
 "A Sleepin' Bee" – w. Truman Capote and Harold Arlen m. Harold Arlen. Introduced in the musical House of Flowers by Diahann Carroll, Ada Moore, Dolores Harper and Enid Mosier
 "Smokey Joe's Cafe" – w.m. Jerry Leiber and Mike Stoller
 "Softly, Softly" – Pierre Dudan, Paddy Roberts and Mark Paul
 "Something's Gotta Give" – w.m. Johnny Mercer. Introduced by Fred Astaire in the musical film Daddy Long Legs.
 "Speedoo" – w.m. Esther Navarro
 "Stereophonic Sound" – w.m. Cole Porter from the musical Silk Stockings
 "A Story Untold" – Leroy Griffin
 "Suddenly There's a Valley" – w.m. Chuck Meyer and Biff Jones
 "Tango Verde" – m. Aldemaro Romero, arranger John Serry Sr. for accordion quartet
 "(Love Is) The Tender Trap" w. Sammy Cahn m. Jimmy Van Heusen. Introduced by Frank Sinatra in the film The Tender Trap.
 "Theme from East Of Eden" – m. Leonard Rosenman
 "Tina Marie" – w.m. Bob Merrill
 "Tutti Frutti" – w.m. Richard Penniman, D. La Bostrie and Joe Lubin
 "Two Lost Souls" – w.m. Richard Adler and Jerry Ross. Introduced by Gwen Verdon and Stephen Douglass in the musical Damn Yankees
 "Unchained Melody" – w. Hy Zaret m. Alex North
 "Wake the Town and Tell the People" – w. Sammy Gallop m. Jerry Livingston
 "The Wallflower" (aka "Dance With Me Henry") – w.m. Johnny Otis, Hank Ballard and Etta James
 "Whatever Lola Wants" – w.m. Richard Adler and Jerry Ross. Introduced by Gwen Verdon in the musical Damn Yankees. Gwen also performed the song in the 1958 film version.
 "Why Do Fools Fall in Love" – w.m. Frankie Lymon and George Goldner
 "A Woman in Love" – w.m. Frank Loesser
 "You Are My Love" w.m. Jimmie Nabbie
 "You Don't Know Me" – w.m. Cindy Walker and Eddy Arnold
 "You're Sensational" – w.m. Cole Porter. Introduced by Frank Sinatra in the musical film High Society

Other notable songs
"Mera Joota Hai Japani" by Shankar-Jaikishan
"Moscow Nights" by Vasily Solovyov-Sedoy and Mikhail Matusovsky
"Satumaa" by Unto Mononen

Classical music

Premieres

Compositions
Milton Babbitt – Sonnets (2), for baritone voice, clarinet, viola, and cello
Jean Barraqué – Séquence
Luciano Berio
Mimusique No. 2 for orchestra
Mutazione for tape
Quartetto
Variazione for chamber orchestra
Arthur Bliss
Meditations on a Theme by John Blow, Op. 118
Violin Concerto, Op. 111
Ernest Bloch – Proclamation, B.91
Pierre Boulez – Le Marteau sans maître
York Bowen – Rhapsody for Viola and Piano in G Major
Mario Castelnuovo-Tedesco
Tre Preludi mediterranei, Op. 176
Escarramán, Op. 177
Eric Coates – The Dam Busters March
Henry Cowell – Symphony No. 12
George Crumb
Diptych for orchestra
Sonata for solo cello
Mario Davidovsky
Quintet for Clarinet and Strings
Suite Sinfonica Para "El Payaso" for orchestra
Einar Englund – Piano Concerto No. 1
Ferenc Farkas – Bukki Varlatok
Gerald Finzi – Cello Concerto
Henryk Mikołaj Górecki –
Four Preludes, Op. 1
Toccata, Op. 2, for two pianos
Camargo Guarnieri
Poemas afro-brasileiros (3), for voice and orchestra
Ponteios, vol. 3, for piano
Sonata No. 2, for cello and piano
Songs (2), for voice and piano
Howard Hanson – Symphony No. 5, Op. 43, Sinfonia Sacra (premiered February 18 in Philadelphia)
Hans Werner Henze – Symphony No. 4
Vagn Holmboe
String Quartet No. 5, Op. 66
Cantata No. 9
Alan Hovhaness – Symphony No. 2 Mysterious Mountain
Wojciech Kilar
Small Overture (Little Overture) for symphony orchestra
Symphony for Strings
Zoltan Kodaly – Nemzeti dal
Osvaldo Lacerda – Miniaturas de Adelmar Tavares (4), for voice and piano
Witold Lutosławski – Dance Preludes (2nd version for clarinet and chamber group)
Bohuslav Martinů
Gilgameš (choral work based on the Epic of Gilgamesh)
The Frescoes of Piero della Francesca (Les fresques de Piero della Francesca, orchestral; composed)
Oboe Concerto
Darius Milhaud – Symphony No. 6
Luigi Nono
Canti per tredeci for 13 instruments
Incontri for 24 instruments
Per Nørgård
Symphony No. 1 Sinfonia austera
Trio No. 1, Op. 15
Walter Piston – Symphony No. 6
Edmund Rubbra – Piano Concerto
William Schuman – Credendum
John Serry Sr. –
 American Rhapsody – for Stradella Accordion
 Petite Tango – for Stradella Accordion
 Tarantella – for Stradella Accordion revised
Fela Sowande – African Suite for string orchestra
Karlheinz Stockhausen – Klavierstücke V–VIII
Igor Stravinsky – Canticum Sacrum
Alexandre Tansman
Concerto for Orchestra
Capriccio for Orchestra
Michael Tippett
Piano Concerto (composition completed)
Sonata for Four Horns
Ernst Toch – Symphony No. 3
Ralph Vaughan Williams – Symphony No. 8 in D minor
Heitor Villa-Lobos
String Quartet No. 16
Symphony No. 11
William Walton
Johannesburg Festival Overture
Score for Richard III (film)
Franz Waxman – Sinfonietta for Strings and Timpani
Iannis Xenakis - Pithoprakta for orchestra

Opera
Carlisle Floyd – Susannah (premiered February 24 at Florida State University, Tallahassee)
Lukas Foss – Griffelkin (opera in three acts, libretto by A. Reed after H. Foss, premiered November 6 on NBC television in the United States)
Dmitry Kabalevsky – Nikita Vershinin (premiered November 26 at Bolshoi Theatre, Moscow)
Darius Milhaud – Agamemnon and Les choëphores (from the Oresteia trilogy, premiered May 29 at Landestheater Darmstadt, Germany)
Alexis Roland-Manuel – Jeanne d'Arc
Michael Tippett – The Midsummer Marriage (premiered January 27 at Royal Opera House, Covent Garden, London)

Jazz

Musical theater

 The Amazing Adele – Philadelphia production
 Ankles Aweigh – Broadway production
 Catch A Star – Broadway production
 Damn Yankees (Richard Adler and Jerry Ross) – Broadway production
 Kismet – London production opens at the Stoll Theatre on April 20 and runs for 648 performances
 The Pajama Game (Richard Adler and Jerry Ross) – London production opens at the Coliseum on October 13 and runs for 501 performances
 Phoenix '55 – Broadway production
 Pipe Dream (Rodgers and Hammerstein) – Broadway production
 Plain and Fancy – Broadway production
 Romance in Candlelight – London production opens at the Piccadilly Theatre on September 15 and runs for 53 performances
 Seventh Heaven – Broadway production opens at the ANTA Playhouse on May 26 and runs for 44 performances
 Shoestring Revue – Broadway production
 Silk Stockings – Broadway production
 Wonderful Town (Leonard Bernstein, Betty Comden and Adolph Green) – London production opens at the Princes Theatre on February 24 and runs for 207 performances

Musical films
Artists and Models released November 7 starring Dean Martin and Jerry Lewis
 As Long as They're Happy starring Jack Buchanan, Janette Scott, Jeannie Carson, Jerry Wayne, Diana Dors and Joan Sims
 The Benny Goodman Story
 Daddy Long Legs
 Gentlemen Marry Brunettes
 The Girl Rush starring Rosalind Russell, Fernando Lamas, Eddie Albert and Gloria DeHaven
 Guys and Dolls released November 3 starring Frank Sinatra and Marlon Brando
 It's Always Fair Weather
 Jupiter's Darling starring Howard Keel, Esther Williams, Marge Champion and Gower Champion
 King's Rhapsody starring Anna Neagle and Errol Flynn
 Kismet
 Lady and the Tramp – animated feature released June 22 featuring the songs and voice of Peggy Lee
 Love Me or Leave Me
 Oklahoma! (Rodgers and Hammerstein) released October 11
 Pete Kelly's Blues
 The Seven Little Foys

Musical television
  Heidi – television production
  Our Town – television production
  Together With Music – CBS television production by Noël Coward

Births
January 3 – Helen O'Hara, British rock violinist (Dexys Midnight Runners)
January 4 – Mark Hollis, English rock singer-songwriter (Talk Talk) (died 2019)
January 8 – Mike Reno, Canadian rock drummer and lead singer (Loverboy and Moxy
January 10 – Michael Schenker, German guitarist, songwriter and producer
January 13
Paul Kelly, rock musician
Trevor Rabin, rock guitarist and vocalist (Yes) and film composer
Fred White, drummer (Earth Wind & Fire) (died 2022)
January 17 – Steve Earle, folk singer (Del McCoury Band)
January 19 – Sir Simon Rattle, orchestral conductor
January 26 – Eddie Van Halen, rock guitarist and songwriter (died 2020)
January 27 – Richard Young (Kentucky Headhunters)
February 12 – Bill Laswell, American bass guitarist and producer (Massacre, Material, Tabla Beat Science, Painkiller and Praxis)
February 18 – Riff Regan, lead singer of rock band London
February 23 – Howard Jones, pop keyboardist and singer-songwriter
March 2 – Jay Osmond, singer-songwriter (The Osmonds)
March 4 – Boon Gould, guitarist (Level 42)
March 10 – Bunny DeBarge, soul singer-songwriter (DeBarge)
March 15 – Dee Snider, rock singer-songwriter (Twisted Sister and Bent Brother)
March 28 – Reba McEntire, country singer
March 31 – Angus Young, rock guitarist and songwriter (AC/DC)
April 10 – Lesley Garrett, soprano
April 13 – Louis Johnson, bass guitarist (The Brothers Johnson)
April 17 – Pete Shelley, rock singer, songwriter and guitarist (Buzzcocks) (died 2018)
May 4 – Lynne Spears, American mother of musician and singer-songwriters Jamie Lynn Spears and Britney Spears
May 9 – Anne Sofie von Otter, operatic mezzo-soprano
May 12 – Kix Brooks, country singer (Brooks & Dunn)
May 13 – Garry Bushell newspaper columnist, rock music journalist and singer, television presenter, writer and political activist
 May 16 – Hazel O'Connor, new wave singer-songwriter
May 20
Steve George, keyboardist (Mr. Mister)
Zbigniew Preisner, composer
May 21 – Stan Lynch, songwriter and drummer (Tom Petty & the Heartbreakers)
May 23 – Mary Black, folk singer
May 29 – Pascal Dusapin, French composer
May 30 – Topper Headon, rock drummer (The Clash)
June 7
Jon Balke, Norwegian pianist and orchestra leader
Joey Scarbury, singer
June 23 – Glenn Danzig, lead singer of Danzig
June 26 – Mick Jones, rock guitarist and singer-songwriter (The Clash)
June 28 – Thomas Hampson, operatic baritone
July 1
 Nikolai Demidenko, classical pianist
 Keith Whitley, country music singer (died 1989)
July 4 – John Waite, rock singer, bass guitarist and songwriter
July 10 – Stan Munsey, songwriter and keyboardist (Shenandoah)
July 18 – Terry Chambers, rock drummer (XTC)
July 21
Howie Epstein, American bass guitarist, songwriter and producer (Tom Petty and the Heartbreakers) (died 2003)
Henry Priestman, English singer-songwriter, keyboardist and producer (The Christians, It's Immaterial and Yachts)
July 25 – Jem Finer, folk rock banjoist, composer (The Pogues) and multimedia artist
July 29 – Eusèbe Jaojoby, salegy composer and singer
August 6 – Eric Paulin, drummer (The Meetles)
August 13 – Mulgrew Miller, American jazz pianist (died 2013)
August 17
Colin Moulding, English bass guitarist, songwriter and vocalist (XTC)
Kevin Welch, American singer-songwriter and guitarist
August 25 – John McGeoch guitarist (Magazine, PiL and Siouxsie and the Banshees) (died 2004)
August 28 – Beres Hammond, reggae singer
August 29 – Diamanda Galás, singer, composer, pianist and performance artist
September 3 – Steve Jones, rock guitarist and singer (The Sex Pistols)
September 9 – Ivan Nikolayevich Smirnov, guitarist
September 13 – Andreas Staier, harpsichordist and fortepianist
September 18 – Sid Griffin, bluegrass singer-songwriter and popular music historian
September 25 – Zucchero Fornaciari, singer-songwriter and blues musician
September 26 – Carlene Carter, American singer-songwriter and guitarist
September 28 – Kenny Kirkland, American jazz pianist (died 1998)
October 2 – Philip Oakey, singer (The Human League)
October 7 – Yo-Yo Ma, cellist
October 16 – Leonid Desyatnikov, composer
October 18 – Hiromi Go, singer
October 21
 Fred Hersch, American jazz pianist
 Rich Mullins, American Christian singer-songwriter (died 1997)
October 25 – Matthias Jabs, German rock guitarist (Scorpions)
October 29
 Kevin Dubrow, American rock singer (Quiet Riot) (died 2007)
 Roger O'Donnell, English rock keyboardist
November 12 – Les McKeown, pop rock singer (Bay City Rollers) (died 2021)
November 21 – Kyle Gann, American composer, teacher and critic
November 23 – Ludovico Einaudi, Italian composer and pianist
November 30 – Billy Idol, rock singer
December 6 – Bright Sheng, composer
December 8 – Kasim Sulton, American singer-songwriter, bass player and producer
December 15 – Paul Simonon, bass guitarist (The Clash)
date unknown – Susan Addison, sackbut player

Deaths
January 10 – Annette Mills, partner of "Muffin the Mule", 60
January 27 – Maurice Frigara, French conductor, 80
February 14 – Charles Cuvillier, composer of operettas, 77
March 12 – Charlie Parker, jazz saxophonist, 34 (lobar pneumonia, bleeding ulcer and cirrhosis of liver)
April 10 – Oskar Lindberg, composer, 67
April 12 – W. H. Anderson, composer, 72
May 4 – George Enescu, composer, 73
May 15 – Oskar Adler, violinist and music critic, 79
May 17 – Francesco Balilla Pratella, composer and musicologist, 75
May 22 – Albert Valsien, composer and conductor, 73
June 11 – Marcel Samuel-Rousseau, organist, composer and opera producer, 72
June 19 – Willy Burkhard, composer, 55
June 28 – Göta Ljungberg, Wagnerian soprano, 56
July 4 – Ruth Vincent, operatic soprano, 78
July 7 – Franco Casavola, Futurist composer, 63
July 25
Isaak Dunayevsky, conductor and composer, 55
Ilmari Hannikainen, composer, 62 (drowned)
August 5 – Carmen Miranda, singer and dancer, 46 (heart attack)
August 13 – Florence Easton, soprano, 72
August 22 – Olin Downes, music critic, 69
August 24 – Edgar Henrichsen, organist and composer, 76
October 7 – Frieda Hempel, operatic soprano, 70
October 14 – Harry Parr-Davies, composer and songwriter, 41 (perforated ulcer)
October 20 – Adolf Mišek, double bassist and composer, 80
October 27 – Bernardo de Muro, operatic tenor, 73
November 11 – Jerry Ross, songwriter, 29 (bronchiectasis)
November 22 – Guy Ropartz, composer and conductor, 91
November 27 – Arthur Honegger, composer, 63
November 30 – Josip Štolcer-Slavenski, composer, 58
December 5 – Lucien Durosoir, violinist and composer, 67
December 11 – Franz Syberg, composer, 51
December 21 – Gladys Ripley, operatic contralto, 47
date unknown
Bessie Brown, blues singer, c.65
Vernon Isley, original Isley brother, 13 (road accident)

References 

 
20th century in music
Music by year